Archeria can refer to two very different taxonomic genera:

 Archeria (animal), a genus of extinct eel like animals
 Archeria (plant), a genus of shrubs in the heath family